Lester Lowry Mays (July 24, 1935 – September 12, 2022) was an American businessman. He was the founder and chairman of Clear Channel Communications.

Early years 
Mays was born in Houston on July 24, 1935. His father, Lester T. Mays, was an executive in the steel industry and died in a car accident when Mays was twelve; his mother, Mary Virginia Lowry, became a real estate agent after her husband's death. Mays was raised in University Park in suburban Dallas, where he attended Highland Park High School. He then studied at the A&M College of Texas (now Texas A&M University), where he received a Bachelor of Science in petroleum engineering.

After graduating in 1957, Mays joined the Air Force, where he served as an officer. Upon his discharge from the Air Force, Mays obtained a Master of Business Administration from Harvard University. He became an investment banker, rising to Vice President of Corporate Finance during his ten years at Russ & Company.

Clear Channel Communications 
In 1972, Mays founded the San Antonio Broadcasting Company, which became Clear Channel Communications. The company purchased its first radio station, KEEZ-FM in San Antonio in 1972. He and his business partner Red McCombs bought a second San Antonio Station, WOAI, in 1975. This station was considered a "clear channel" station because no other station operated on its frequency and its 50,000-watt signal could be heard hundreds or even thousands of miles away on a clear night. Over the next several years, the company bought ten more struggling radio stations and turned them profitable, usually by switching their formats to religious or talk programming. Their first non–San Antonio acquisition was 1250 KPAC and 98.5 KPAC-FM in Port Arthur, bought from the then Port Arthur College, now Lamar-Port Arthur. KPAC-FM was upgraded by Clear Channel in the early 1980s to be their first "Houston" station when the company built a 2,000-ft tower near Devers, Texas, hoping to cover Houston. The effort failed to meet expectations and the station was sold after Clear Channel bought radio stations with in-town Houston signals. The company went public in 1984. Four years later, the company bought its first television station.

By the mid-90s, Clear Channel Communications owned 43 radio and 16 television stations. After the Telecommunications Act of 1996 significantly deregulated the broadcast industry, Mays and his company purchased 49 radio stations and an interest in New Zealand's largest radio group. A merger with Jacor Communications, based in Covington, Kentucky (which had bought the former broadcast side of Nationwide Insurance a year earlier), brought the operation of 450 stations to the Clear Channel portfolio. Within eight years, and with an influx of capital investment from the private-equity Griffith Family, Clear Channel had accumulated ownership of over 1,200 radio stations and 41 television stations in the United States, one of the nation's leading live entertainment companies, and over 750,000 outdoor advertising displays.

In 2003, Mays testified before the US Senate that the deregulation of the telecommunications industry had not hurt the public. However, in an interview that same year with Fortune magazine, he remarked, "We're not in the business of providing news and information. We're not in the business of providing well-researched music. We're simply in the business of selling our customers' products."

Mays was inducted into the Radio Hall of Fame in 2004. After suffering a stroke the following year, Mays relinquished his position as a CEO of the company to his son, Mark Mays.

Texas A&M University 
Mays served on the Texas A&M Board of Regents from 1985 to 1991. He was reappointed to the Board of Regents in 2001 and served as chairman of the Board of Regents from 2003 to 2005. He was also a chair of the Presidential Library Committee and a member of the Committee on Buildings and Physical Plant and was the Board's special liaison to the Texas A&M Foundation. His final term on the Board of Regents expired on February 1, 2007.

Mays donated a substantial amount of money to the school to improve the business department. In 1996, A&M rewarded him by renaming their business school, now Mays Business School, in his honor.

Personal life and death 
Mays served as a chairman of the United Way of San Antonio. He was also a member of the Associates Board at Harvard Business School. He was inducted into the Texas Business Hall of Fame in 1999.

Mays was married to Peggy Pitman from 1959 until her death in November 2020. Together, they had four children, Kathy, Mark, Linda, and Randall Mays. They lived in San Antonio, Texas, where they oversaw the operations and giving of the Mays Family Foundation. His son-in-law, Michael McCaul, is a Republican congressman from Texas's 10th congressional district.

Mays died in San Antonio on September 12, 2022, at age 87.

Awards and honors 
 1997 San Antonio Business Hall of Fame
 1998 Golden Plate Award of the American Academy of Achievement
 1999 Texas Business Hall of Fame
 2004 Radio Hall of Fame
 2010 Sterling C. Evans Medal

References

External links 
 
 Profile at Clear Channel
 "Clear Channel Rules the World"
 Texas A&M Board of Regents
 San Antonio-Express article
 Interview On The BusinessMakers Show, October 18, 2008.

1935 births
2022 deaths
Harvard Business School alumni
IHeartMedia
American radio company founders
Texas A&M University alumni
Businesspeople from Houston
Military personnel from Texas
Deaths from cerebrovascular disease
Harvard University alumni
People from University Park, Texas
Highland Park High School (University Park, Texas) alumni
United States Air Force officers